The 2004 European Championship Tour (or the 2004 European Beach Volleyball Tour) was the European beach volleyball tour for 2004.

The tour consisted of five tournaments with both genders, including the 2004 Championship Final.

Tournaments
Italian Open, in Roseto degli Abruzzi, Italy – 12–16 May 2004
Zagreb Challenger, in Zagreb, Croatia – 3–6 June 2004
2004 European Championship Final, in Timmendorfer Strand, Germany – 9–13 June 2004
Slavkov Challenger, in Slavkov, Czech Republic – 6–8 August 2004
Spanish Open, in Valencia, Spain – 9–12 September 2004

Tournament results

Women

Men

Medal table by country

References

 

European
Nestea European Championship Tour